Derek Charles France is a United States Air Force major general who serves as the commander of Third Air Force since June 22, 2022. He most recently served as the director of operations, strategic deterrence, and nuclear integration of the United States Air Forces in Europe – Air Forces Africa and before that was the deputy director of operations of the United States Africa Command.

References

External links

 

 

Living people
Year of birth missing (living people)
Place of birth missing (living people)
United States Air Force generals